Steven De Lelie (born 25 February 1977) is an actor and theatre director.

He is mostly known in the theatre world for his part in Kartonnen dozen (Cardboard Boxes), a monologue from a book by the same name by Tom Lanoye and De Libertijn (The Libertine). He also directed the theatre piece, The Jungle Book and a second production Inside the Moulin Rouge.

Awards 
In his role of Creon in Creon's Antigone, a play by Miro Gavran, he got an award for Best Actor in a protagonist role during the Holland Theatre festival.

Notable roles 
In the TV series Lili & Marleen, he played the part of Rikki, a young boy in the Antwerp of the '60s who finds himself falling for a girl who's not of his class, Vicky Muys, played by Grietje Vanderheijden.

In the TV series Familie, he plays the character Bertje Vandenbossche (originally played by Mout Uytersprot). After Bertje left for China five years ago, he is now back being more a hard business man ánd having a Chinese girlfriend. In these years in China, he got divorced from Tineke & started working in an IT-company where he met Cixi, his current girlfriend. Also he gained confidence and is more at it for the money than for the friendships.

In the play Kartonnen dozen, Steven plays the part of a young man who's trying to figure out the way through his sexuality. In the play, 3 cardboard boxes represent 3 eras in his life which he had to overcome.

Filmography 
Lili & Marleen...Rikki Dilliarkis
Spoed...Guest starring, Man with injury
Familie...Bert Van den Bossche
Pitt & Kantrop... Pitt
Het Verstand van Vlaanderen (familiespecial)...himself

Stage credits 
De Libertijn - theatre play - Raamtheater Antwerp... Baronet/secretary of the encyclopedia
Kartonnen Dozen - theatre monologue - Raamtheater Antwerp... Tom Lanoye
Inside Moulin Rouge - theatre play - director of the play
The Jungle Book - theatre play - director of the play

References

Flemish male stage actors
1977 births
Living people
Flemish male voice actors
Flemish male television actors
20th-century Flemish male actors